Ahmed Abdul Rahman Al-Hadrami is a Saudi Arabian football midfielder. He started playing for the first team in the 2008-2009 season after joining from Al Hajer club.

References

External links

Saudi Arabian footballers
1988 births
Living people
Hajer FC players
Al Nassr FC players
Al-Fateh SC players
Al-Raed FC players
Al-Tai FC players
Al-Hazem F.C. players
Al Jeel Club players
Saudi First Division League players
Saudi Professional League players
Association football wingers